Wouter Maria Toledo (17 May 1944 - 21 July 2018) was a Dutch figure skater.

Results

External links

 results

1944 births
Dutch male single skaters
Olympic figure skaters of the Netherlands
Figure skaters at the 1964 Winter Olympics
Sportspeople from The Hague
Dutch people of Spanish descent
Spanish people of Dutch descent
2018 deaths